Brian George Wenham (9 February 1937 – 8 May 1997) was the controller of BBC2 from 1978 until 1982. He was known for having nurtured Not the Nine O'Clock News, and coverage of snooker and opera.

He had been a senior producer for ITN on News at Ten in the 1960s, moving to the BBC at the age of 32 to become the editor of Panorama in 1969.

Notes

1937 births
1997 deaths
BBC executives
BBC Two controllers
20th-century British businesspeople